Botrel, Bothrel, Botherel or Bothorel a Breton surname, and may refer to;

Boterel means toad in Old French. Probably a nickname given to a person who used to have swollen cheeks.
 Alan Botrel - Breton writer and philologue
 Théodore Botrel - Breton singer-songwriter, poet and playwright
 Yannick Botrel - member of the Senate of France

 Éric Bothorel - French politician

Surnames of Breton origin
French-language surnames